The Lithuanian A Lyga 1996–97 was the seventh season of top-tier football in Lithuania. The season started on 13 July 1996 and ended on 22 June 1997. It was contested by 16 teams, and Kareda Šiauliai won the championship.

Group A

Standings

Results

First half of season

Second half of season

Group B

Standings

Results

First half of season

Second half of season

References 

LFF Lyga seasons
1997 in Lithuanian football
1996 in Lithuanian football
Lith